Quesna (  ) is a city in Monufia Governorate, Egypt. It has an area of 49009 feddans (210 square kilometers).

The older name of the town is Qusaniya.

Notable people
Tamer Abdel Raouf

References 

Populated places in Monufia Governorate